The Johnstown Housing Authority in  Pennsylvania, USA,  is the only municipal authority in Cambria County that is designated to oversee public housing. Johnstown Housing Authority has four housing projects as well as four senior buildings inside the city limits. In 2011, the authority had a 98-percent occupancy rate as well as a waiting list.

Housing Projects

See also
 List of municipal authorities in Cambria County, Pennsylvania
 Housing and Urban Development
 City of Johnstown Housing Authotrity Project Map, Johnstown Tribune-Democrat
 List of public housing authorities in Pennsylvania

References

Public housing in Pennsylvania
Cambria County, Pennsylvania